Myanmar Women Self Defense Center (MWSDC) was founded by three women in February 2016 in Yangon, Myanmar. MWSDC aim to build other Myanmar Women's knowledge of how to protect themselves when faced with sexual harassment.

Founding members are Michelle, Evelyn Yu Yu Swe and Saw Yu Ko.

References

Sexual harassment
Self-defense
Violence against women in Myanmar
Women's organisations based in Myanmar